Maculatipalma is a fungal genus in the family Valsaceae. This is a monotypic genus, containing the single species Maculatipalma frondicola, originally discovered growing on a leaf of Linospadix microcaryus in Queensland.

References

External links

Diaporthales
Monotypic Sordariomycetes genera